The canton of Lagord is an administrative division of the Charente-Maritime department, western France. It was created at the French canton reorganisation which came into effect in March 2015. Its seat is in Lagord.

It consists of the following communes:
Esnandes
L'Houmeau
Lagord
Marsilly
Nieul-sur-Mer
Saint-Xandre

References

Cantons of Charente-Maritime